The Fao festival is celebrated by the chiefs and peoples of Navrongo in the Upper East Region of Ghana. The festival is celebrated in the month of January every year.

References

Festivals in Ghana